Carlos Rodriguez (1943–1991) was a bodybuilder and winner of the 1978 Mr. Universe. He also placed in the 1979 and the 1981 Mr. Olympia. In the bodybuilding circuit, he was referred to as the "Pride of the U.S. Marines." 

He owned Sportsworld Fitness Center in Tucson, Arizona.

Biography
Rodriguez served in the United States Marine Corps 1961–1966, and set the record for the most push-ups in 2 minutes at 149, and most pull-ups in one minute at 47. He was stationed at Marine Corps Base Camp Lejeune, North Carolina. While serving in the Marines, he scheduled his workouts around his daily duties often using split routines.

References

1943 births
1991 deaths
American bodybuilders
American military sports players
Deaths from cancer in Arizona
Deaths from stomach cancer
United States Marines